The 2010–11 Maltese FA Trophy was the 73rd season since its establishment. It will feature 21 teams from the Maltese Premier League, the First Division and the champions of the Gozo First Division. The competition began on 10 November 2010 and ended 22 May 2011 with the Final from Ta' Qali Stadium. The defending champions are Valletta, having won their 12th Maltese Cup last season and first since 2001.  The winner will qualify to the second qualifying round of the 2011–12 UEFA Europa League.

Valletta were the defending champions, but lost in the Final to Floriana.

Calendar
Matches will begin on 10 November 2010 and conclude with the final on 22 May 2011.  For the second straight year, four teams will receive a bye directly into the quarterfinals.

Preliminary round
Entering this round were two clubs from the Maltese First Division. This match took place on 10 November 2010.

|colspan="3" style="background:#fcc;"|10 November 2010

|}

First round
Entering this round was the winner from the preliminary round along with the six Maltese Premier League clubs which finished last season between 5th and 10th place in the league, the remaining eight clubs from the First Division and the reigning Gozo First Division champions. These matches took place from 12 to 14 November 2010.

|colspan="3" style="background:#fcc;"|12 November 2010

|-
|colspan="3" style="background:#fcc;"|13 November 2010

|-
|colspan="3" style="background:#fcc;"|14 November 2010

|}

Second round
Entering this round were the eight winners from the first round. These matches took place on 19 January 2011.

|colspan="3" style="background:#fcc;"|19 January 2011

|}

Quarter-finals
Entering this round were the four winners from the second round along with the best four clubs from last year's Premier League competition.

Semi-finals
Entering this round were the four winners from the Quarterfinals.

Final
Entering this round were the two winners from the Semifinals.

References

External links
 Official site

Maltese Cup
Cup
Maltese FA Trophy seasons